Rhopalocarpus coriaceus is a tree in the family Sphaerosepalaceae. It is endemic to Madagascar.

Distribution and habitat
Rhopalocarpus coriaceus is known from populations along the east coast of Madagascar, specifically in the regions of Sava, Alaotra Mangoro, Atsimo-Atsinanana, Analanjirofo and Anosy. Its habitat is coastal forests from sea-level to  altitude. Some populations are within protected areas.

Threats
Rhopalocarpus coriaceus is threatened by shifting patterns of agriculture. Because the species is used as timber, subsistence harvesting is also a threat.

References

coriaceus
Endemic flora of Madagascar
Trees of Madagascar
Plants described in 1890